Dragon Mart is a set of two adjacent shopping malls in Dubai International City, a suburb of Dubai, United Arab Emirates. Dragon Mart is 1.2 kilometre long and is the "largest Chinese retail trading hub outside mainland China". It is includes the largest concentration of Chinese businesses in the UAE.

Overview
There are two Dragon Mart malls in separate buildings next to each other.
The original Dragon Mart 1 shops are organized in various sections for each type of market, such as furniture, textiles, household items, lighting equipment, sports and garments, etc. The newer Dragon Mart 2 is more like a traditional shopping mall with four sections covering general merchandise, building materials, home appliances, and hardware and machinery. Dragon Mart is located south of Al Awir Road (E 44) and east of Sheikh Mohammad Bin Zayed Road (E 311). It is north of the China Cluster, an area in Dubai International City.

Dragon Mart 1
The original mall, for the wholesale purchase of Chinese products, was the first to be developed by Chinamex as a key project in the expansion of Chinese ties in the Persian Gulf countries. Inspired by the Forbidden City of Beijing, China, the original Dragon Mart 1 covers an area of 240,000 square metres with parking facilities for 2,000 cars, dating from 2004. Dragon Mart was developed by Nakheel Properties in association with Chinamex.

Dragon Mart 2
After The mall has been a commercial success and has led to the construction of a second mall, Dragon Mart 2, adjacent to the original Dragon Mart mall, covering 175,000 square metres of space and with 4,500 parking spaces. The project was completed in December 2015. The mall opened by His Highness Shaikh Mohammed bin Rashid Al Maktoum on 9 Feb 2016. Dragon Mart 2 have Novo Cinemas complex with 12 screens and a NestO supermarket. There are food courts in both malls.

See also
 Chinese people in the United Arab Emirates

References

External links

 Dragon Mart website
 Dragon Mart 1 & 2 walking tour on YouTube

2004 establishments in the United Arab Emirates
Shopping malls established in 2004
Shopping malls in Dubai
Nakheel Properties
China–United Arab Emirates relations
Chinese diaspora in Asia